Clorexolone is a low-ceiling sulfonamide diuretic.

References 

Diuretics
Sulfonamides
Isoindoles
Lactams
Chloroarenes
Cyclohexyl compounds